The Wedding Chest is a 2006 Kyrgyz film directed by Nurbek Egen. It was Kyrgyzstan's submission to the 79th Academy Awards for the Academy Award for Best Foreign Language Film, as well as its first submission to the Academy in its history, but it was not accepted as a nominee.

See also
List of submissions to the 79th Academy Awards for Best Foreign Language Film

References

External links

2006 films
2006 comedy films
Kyrgyzstani comedy films